Masalaye was a Nubian royal lady known only from her burial at Nuri (Nu. 23). Her burial consisted of a pyramid (about 10 m in square), a chapel in front of the pyramid and of tow burial chambers under the pyramid, that were reached via a staircase. The burial chamber was found heavily looted, but still contained at least 50 shabti figures that provide her name. Several shabtis of queen Nasala were found too, that might came into the tomb due to the general looting of the whole cemeterey. Masalaye does not bear any title. Her name is written within a cartouche indicating a royal status. It had been proposed that she was the wife of Senkamanisken. This is only a guess.

References 

7th-century BC women
7th-century BC Egyptian people
Queens of Kush